Croaghanmoira at , is the 136th–highest peak in Ireland on the Arderin scale, and the 165th–highest peak on the Vandeleur-Lynam scale. Croaghanmoira is situated in the far south-east corner of the Wicklow Mountains range, and sits on its own small massif with several other lesser but well known peaks, separated from the nearby larger massif of Lugnaquilla by the Laragh to Aghavannagh road; the summit of Croaghanmoira has a distinctive "pyramidal" profile.

Naming
According to Irish academic Paul Tempan, the "Moira" is from the title of the "Earl of Moira" who owned lands around Greenan, and historical papers record references to the purchase of the Ballinacor Estate and House from Francis Rawdon-Hastings, 1st Marquess of Hastings, the "Earl of Moira" in 1805. At the time of the purchase, the mountain would have been the "Cruachán" behind Ballinacor House. Tempan notes another name for the mountain, The Mottie.

Geography

Bibliography

See also
Wicklow Way
Wicklow Mountains
Lists of mountains in Ireland
List of mountains of the British Isles by height
List of Marilyns in the British Isles
List of Hewitt mountains in England, Wales and Ireland

References

External links
MountainViews: The Irish Mountain Website, Croaghanmoira
MountainViews: Irish Online Mountain Database
The Database of British and Irish Hills , the largest database of British Isles mountains ("DoBIH")
Hill Bagging UK & Ireland, the searchable interface for the DoBIH

Marilyns of Ireland
Mountains and hills of County Wicklow
Hewitts of Ireland
Mountains under 1000 metres